Man and Maid is a lost 1925 drama film directed by Victor Schertzinger based on a 1922 novel by Elinor Glyn. The film stars Lew Cody, Renée Adorée and Harriet Hammond.

Plot
Boulevardier Sir Nicholas Thormonde (Lew Cody) has to choose between his mistress Suzette (Renée Adorée) and his virtuous secretary Alathea (Harriet Hammond) in wartimе Paris.

Cast
 Lew Cody - Sir Nicholas Thormonde
 Renée Adorée - Suzette
 Harriet Hammond - Alathea Bulteel
 Paulette Duval - Coralie
 Alec B. Francis - Burton
 Crauford Kent - Col. George Harcourt
 David Mir - Maurice
 Jacqueline Gadsden - Lady Hilda Buiteel
 Winston Miller - Little Bobby
 Jane Mercer - Little Hilda
 Irving Hartley - Atwood Chester

References

External links

Man and Maid review at AllMovie Guide

1925 films
Metro-Goldwyn-Mayer films
American silent feature films
1925 drama films
Lost American films
American black-and-white films
Silent American drama films
Films directed by Victor Schertzinger
Lost drama films
1925 lost films
1920s American films
1920s English-language films
English-language drama films